= Bristol, Massachusetts =

Bristol, Massachusetts may refer to:

- Bristol County, Massachusetts
- Bristol, Rhode Island, formerly a town in Massachusetts
